Fred Mortensen (born March 24, 1954) was a former college football player at Arizona State University.

Fred played three years in the United States Football League, playing quarterback for the Denver Gold in 1983 and 1984 and the San Antonio Gunslingers in 1985.

In the 1990s Fred also served as a high school Football coach for the Tempe High School Buffalo Varsity football team where both his son Todd and Nathan attended. Fred quarterbacked Tempe High School to the state finals in 1971.  In the 1975 Fiesta Bowl, Fred helped lead the Sun Devils to a 17-14 victory over Nebraska.  Today Mortensen lives in Tempe where he acts as a member, and former Bishop, of  The Church of Jesus Christ of Latter-day Saints, and runs a general contracting business.

References 
he was a mission president in Bengalaru India for the church of Jesus Christ of Latter Day Saint

1954 births
American football quarterbacks
Arizona State Sun Devils football players
Living people
People from Safford, Arizona
San Antonio Gunslingers players
Denver Gold players